Qing'er may refer to:

Xiaoqing (character), a fictional character from the Legend of the White Snake, also known as Qing'er
Qing'er, a fictional character from Chiung Yao's TV series My Fair Princess, see List of My Fair Princess characters
Lee Chi Ching (born 1963), Hong Kong manhua illustrator, pen name Ching-yi or Qing'er

See also
Erhua